Three Songs is a set of songs for voice and piano composed in 1926 by John Ireland (18791962). It consists of settings of three poems by various poets.

A typical performance of the three songs as a set takes 8 minutes. The poems are:

 "Love and Friendship" (Emily Brontë (181848), from Wuthering Heights and Agnes Grey)
 "Friendship in Misfortune" (poet not identified)
 "The One Hope" (Dante Gabriel Rossetti (182882), from Poems (1870))

References 

Song cycles by John Ireland
Classical song cycles in English
1926 compositions
Musical settings of poems by Emily Brontë
Musical settings of poems by Dante Gabriel Rossetti